Vanlue is a village in Hancock County, Ohio, United States. The population was 359 at the 2010 census.

History
The village is 2 miles west from Sheriden Cave where native habitation was dated to have occurred around 11,000BC.

Vanlue was platted in 1847 by William Vanlue, and named for him. A post office called Vanlue has been in operation since 1850.

Geography
Vanlue is located at  (40.975416, -83.480464).

Demographics

2010 census
As of the census of 2010, there were 359 people, 141 households, and 93 families living in the village. The racial makeup of the village was 98.3% White, 0.3% African American, 0.6% from other races, and 0.8% from two or more races. Hispanic or Latino of any race were 5.3% of the population.

There were 141 households, of which 34.8% had children under the age of 18 living with them, 53.9% were married couples living together, 11.3% had a female householder with no husband present, 0.7% had a male householder with no wife present, and 34.0% were non-families. 27.0% of all households were made up of individuals, and 12.7% had someone living alone who was 65 years of age or older. The average household size was 2.55 and the average family size was 3.15.

The median age in the village was 35.8 years. 26.5% of residents were under the age of 18; 9.4% were between the ages of 18 and 24; 26.1% were from 25 to 44; 23.7% were from 45 to 64; and 14.2% were 65 years of age or older. The gender makeup of the village was 47.1% male and 52.9% female.

2000 census
As of the census of 2000, there were 371 people, 141 households, and 104 families living in the village. The population density was 1,325.8 people per square mile (511.6/km). There were 151 housing units at an average density of 539.6 per square mile (208.2/km). The racial makeup of the village was 96.77% White, 0.27% African American, 0.27% Native American, 1.08% from other races, and 1.62% from two or more races. Hispanic or Latino of any race were 1.35% of the population.

There were 141 households, out of which 35.5% had children under the age of 18 living with them, 56.7% were married couples living together, 10.6% had a female householder with no husband present, and 26.2% were non-families. 21.3% of all households were made up of individuals, and 14.2% had someone living alone who was 65 years of age or older. The average household size was 2.63 and the average family size was 3.07.

In the village, the population was spread out, with 29.9% under the age of 18, 8.4% from 18 to 24, 26.7% from 25 to 44, 19.7% from 45 to 64, and 15.4% who were 65 years of age or older. The median age was 35 years. For every 100 females there were 93.2 males. For every 100 females age 18 and over, there were 94.0 males.

The median income for a household in the village was $31,786, and the median income for a family was $37,500. Males had a median income of $34,886 versus $21,964 for females. The per capita income for the village was $14,768. None of the families and 3.7% of the population were living below the poverty line, including no under eighteens and 15.4% of those over 64.

References

Villages in Hancock County, Ohio
Villages in Ohio